T3 is an independent advertising agency headquartered in Austin, Texas and offices in New York City, Atlanta, and San Francisco. The agency, which focuses on building useful brands, was founded in 1989 by CEO Gay Gaddis. T3 is one of the largest independent agencies owned by a woman in the United States, with capitalized billings over $230 million.

Clients

T3's clients include Allstate and UPS.

Work and awards
T3 ranks among AdWeek's Top 100 Agencies and Advertising Age's 2006 Top 100 U.S. Marketing Services Agencies lists.

T3 has experience in both traditional and digital media across various verticals: Automotive, consumer goods, financial, government, healthcare, non-profit, retail, service, technology and travel. Within the digital realm, T3 offers analytics, application development, mobile, online advertising, web architecture and development, video, social and email. T3 created Coca-Cola Freestyle's first mobile app, PUSH! + Play for the iPhone and Android.

Noteworthy work includes Wall Street Journal's "Every Journey Needs a Journal" site,Creative Showcase JCPenney's desktop application, JCPToday, Dell's Virtual Office, and Marriott's Plug-In Site.

August 2011: CEO, Gay Gaddis was named one of the Top 10 Hottest Digital Marketers by iMedia.

Leadership
Chief Executive Officer: Ben Gaddis

Chief Operating Officer: Christian Barnard

SVP, Chief Creative Officer: Jay Suhr

Family-friendly policies
"T3 and Under" is the agency's in-house childcare program that allows new parents to bring their babies to work until they are nine months old. T3's family-friendly workplace programs have been recognized by the White House, The Today Show, The New York Times, Fortune Small Business and Good Morning America''.

See also
 List of companies based in Austin, Texas

References

1989 establishments in Texas
Advertising agencies of the United States
Companies based in Austin, Texas
Privately held companies based in Texas